Israel Escobar Durán (born January 6, 1993 in Tijuana, Baja California) is a professional Mexican footballer who currently plays for Tecos.

External links
Ascenso MX 

1993 births
Living people
Sportspeople from Tijuana
Mexican footballers
Tecos F.C. footballers
Mineros de Zacatecas players
Tlaxcala F.C. players
Coras de Nayarit F.C. footballers
Association football midfielders